Frigga Braut (1889–1975) was a German stage and film actress.

Selected filmography
 Cock of the Roost (1925)
 Slums of Berlin (1925)
 Malice (1926)
 We'll Meet Again in the Heimat (1926)
 Tea Time in the Ackerstrasse (1926)
 Heaven on Earth (1927)
 The Bordellos of Algiers (1927)
 Aftermath (1927)
 Adam and Eve (1928)
 Anesthesia (1929)
 Scandalous Eva (1930)
 The Stolen Face (1930)
 Who Takes Love Seriously? (1931)
 Paprika (1932)
 Madonna in Chains (1949)

References

Bibliography 
 Rentschler, Eric. The Films of G.W. Pabst: An Extraterritorial Cinema. Rutgers University Press, 1990.

External links 
 

Actresses from Hamburg
1889 births
1975 deaths
German film actresses
German stage actresses